The 1966–67 FA Cup was the 86th season of the world's oldest football cup competition, the Football Association Challenge Cup, commonly known as the FA Cup. Tottenham Hotspur won the competition for the fifth time, beating Chelsea 2–1 in the first all-London final. The game was played at Wembley.

Matches were scheduled to be played at the stadium of the team named first on the date specified for each round, which was always a Saturday. Some matches, however, might be rescheduled for other days if there were clashes with games for other competitions or the weather was inclement. If scores were level after 90 minutes had been played, a replay would take place at the stadium of the second-named team later the same week. If the replayed match was drawn further replays would be held until a winner was determined. If scores were level after 90 minutes had been played in a replay, a 30-minute period of extra time would be played.

Calendar

Results

First round proper

At this stage clubs from the Football League Third and Fourth Divisions joined 30 non-league clubs having come through the qualifying rounds. To complete this round, Wealdstone and Hendon given byes. Matches were scheduled to be played on Saturday, 26 November 1966. Ten were drawn and went to replays two, three or four days later. Of these, four required second replays, and two third replays.

Second round proper 
The matches were scheduled for Saturday, 7 January 1967. Five matches were drawn, with replays taking place later the same week. The Middlesbrough–York City match required a second game to settle the contest. This was the last time that the Second Round of the FA Cup was scheduled for January, rather than the typical December.

Third round proper
The 44 First and Second Division clubs entered the competition at this stage. The matches were scheduled for Saturday, 28 January 1967. Eleven matches were drawn and went to replays, one of which (Hull City–Portsmouth) required a second replay.

Fourth round proper
The matches were scheduled for Saturday, 18 February 1967. Six matches were drawn and went to replays. The replays were all played three or four days later, except for the Fulham–Sheffield United match which was settled on the 1 March.

Fifth Round Proper
The matches were scheduled for Saturday, 11 March 1967. Three games required replays three or four days later, and only one of these replays finished not in a draw. The second replays took place on 20 March.

Sixth Round Proper

The four quarter-final ties were scheduled to be played on 8 April 1967. The Tottenham–Birmingham City game was replayed four days later following a draw.

Semi-finals

The semi-final matches were played on Saturday, 29 April 1967 with no replays required. Spurs and Chelsea came through the semi final round to meet at Wembley.

Final

The 1967 FA Cup Final was contested by Tottenham Hotspur and Chelsea at Wembley on Saturday 20 May 1967. The match was the first ever all-London final and finished 2–1 to Spurs.

References
General
The FA Cup Archive at TheFA.com
English FA Cup 1966/67 at Soccerbase
F.A. Cup results 1966/67 at Footballsite
Specific

 
FA Cup seasons
Fa
Eng